"Panic Cord" is a song by English singer-songwriter Gabrielle Aplin. It was released as the third single from her debut studio album English Rain (2013). It was released as a digital Extended play in the United Kingdom on 5 May 2013. The song is originally taken from Aplin's second self-released EP, Never Fade.

It reached Number 19 in the UK Singles Chart on 12 May.

Music video
A music video directed by Kinga Burza to accompany the release of "Panic Cord" was first released onto YouTube on 10 March 2013 at a total length of three minutes and twenty-seven seconds.

Track listings

Chart performance

Release history

References

Gabrielle Aplin songs
2013 singles
Songs written by Jez Ashurst
2013 songs
Parlophone singles
Songs written by Gabrielle Aplin
Songs written by Nick Atkinson